Arenimonas subflava is a Gram-negative, aerobic and non-motile bacterium from the genus of Arenimonas which has been isolated from a drinking water network from Budapest in Hungary.

References

Xanthomonadales
Bacteria described in 2015